L'ajo nell'imbarazzo (The Tutor Embarrassed or The Tutor in a Jam) is a melodramma giocoso, or opera, in two acts by Gaetano Donizetti. The Italian libretto was written by Jacopo Ferretti, after the 1807 play by Giovanni Giraud. At its premiere at the Teatro Valle, Rome, on 4 February 1824, it "was greeted with wild enthusiasm [and] it was with this opera that [...] Donizetti had his first really lasting success" During revisions planned for the 1826 production in Naples, Donizetti renamed the opera Don Gregorio, and it is under that name that most later productions were staged.

Performance history
19th century

Performances were given in many Italian cities and it became the first of the composer's operas to be given outside the country, with productions mounted in Vienna, Dresden, Barcelona, and Rio de Janeiro.

However, before the planned Naples production of 1826, Donizetti revised the opera under the title of Don Gregorio, and under that name, it premiered at the Teatro Nuovo in Naples on 11 June 1826. That same year, it also was given at La Scala. On 28 July 1846 it was first given in London, but "seems to have disappeared from view until it turned up again in Italy in the twentieth century".

20th century and beyond

It was presented at the Teatro Donizetti in the composer's home town of Bergamo in 1959 and an Italian TV production was broadcast in 1964. A successful staging by the Wexford Festival in 1973 led to it appearing in four additional European cities between 1975 and 1990 and a new video recording was made from live performances given by the Teatro Donizetti in November 2007.

Roles

Synopsis
Time: Early nineteenth century
Place: An Italian city

Marquis Giulio demands that his sons, Enrico and Pippetto, grow up in complete ignorance of all matters of the flesh. Yet Enrico has secretly married Gilda, and they even have a son. Exasperated by the life he's forced to lead, the youth begs the elderly tutor Gregorio for help, and has him meet his wife. When, however, the Marquis arrives, Gilda remains trapped in Gregorio's room. She worries, for she must nurse her child: Gregorio is forced to fetch the baby and bring it to her, hidden under his cloak. Leonarda, an old servant in the household, informs the Marquis of her suspicions; he discovers Gilda, but is convinced she must be the tutor's lover. In the tempestuous scene that follows, involving all the characters, the truth finally comes out. The Marquis realizes his error, and decides to entrust his younger son, Pippetto, to Enrico, so that he might help him learn "the ways of the world."

Recordings

References
Notes

Cited sources
Ashbrook, William, [http://www.oxfordmusiconline.com/subscriber/article/grove/music/O900064 "Ajo nell'imbarazzo, L'"] in The New Grove Dictionary of Opera. Ed. Stanley Sadie. Oxford Music Online (accessed 24 September 2011, by subscription)
Ashbrook, William (1998), "Ajo nell'imbarazzo, L" in Stanley Sadie (ed.), The New Grove Dictionary of Opera, vol. two. London: Macmillan. 
Ashbrook, William; Sarah Hibberd (2001), "L'ajo nell'imbarazzio, o Don Gregorio" in Holden, Amanda (ed.), The New Penguin Opera Guide, New York: Penguin Putnam. 
Osborne, Charles, (1994), The Bel Canto Operas of Rossini, Donizetti, and Bellini, Portland, Oregon: Amadeus Press. 

Other sources
Ashbrook, William (1982), Donizetti and His Operas, Cambridge University Press, 
Weinstock, Herbert (1963), Donizetti and the World of Opera in Italy, Paris, and Vienna in the First Half of the Nineteenth Century'', New York: Pantheon Books.

External links 
 
 Libretto (Italian)

Italian-language operas
Operas by Gaetano Donizetti
1824 operas
Operas based on plays
Operas
Operas set in Italy